Yann-Fañch Loeiz Kemener (April 7, 1957 – March 16, 2019) was a traditional singer and ethnomusicologist from Brittany, born in Sainte-Tréphine, Côtes-d'Armor, France. Known in French as Jean-François Louis Quémener.

He took part in reviving Kan ha diskan in the 1970s and 1980s, especially with  Erik Marchand.  He  collected songs from the oral tradition in the Breton language.

He sang in numerous Festoù Noz.

Kemener died in Tréméven on March 16, 2019 at age 61.

Discography
 Chants profonds et sacrés de Bretagne, 1977
 Chants profonds et sacrés de Bretagne 2, 1978
 Chants profonds et sacrés de Bretagne 3, 1982
 Kan ha diskan, 1982, with Marcel Guilloux
 Chants profonds et sacrés de Bretagne 4, 1983
 Chants profonds de Bretagne, 1983
 Dibedibedañchaou, 1987, edited again by Dastum in 1999 (small songs for children in Breton language)
 Gwerziou et soniou, 1988
 Ec'honder, 1989, in Barzaz band
 Chants profonds de Bretagne, 1991
 Un den kozh dall, 1992, in Barzaz band
 Roue Gralon Ni Ho Salud, 1993, with Anne Auffret
 Chants profanes et sacrés de Bretagne - Roue Gralon ni ho salud, 1993
 Enez eusa, 1995, with Didier Squiban
 Ile-exil, 1996, with Didier Squiban
 Karnag / Pierre Lumière, 1996
 Carnet de route, 1996 (collected amongst old people)
 Kan ha diskan, 1997, with Valentine Collecter, Erik Marchand, Marcel Guilloux, Annie Ebrel, Claudine Floc'hig, Patrick Marie, Ifig Troadeg
 Kimiad, 1998, with Didier Squiban
 Barzaz Breiz, 1999, with La Maîtrise de Bretagne
 An Eur Glaz, 2000, with Aldo Ripoche
 An dorn, 2004, with Aldo Ripoche
 Dialogues, 2006, with Aldo Ripoche and Florence Pavie
 Si je savais voler, chants de Bretagne et d'Occitanie, 2010, avec Laurent Audemard, François Fava and Renat Sette
 Requiem d'Anne de Bretagne, 2011, on a cd with a recording of a Renaissance Requiem, with Ensemble Doulce Mémoire and Denis Raisin-Dadre
 YFK~2016, 2016, with band ba.fnu

References

External links
 Official website 
 Personal blog  

1957 births
2019 deaths
People from Côtes-d'Armor
Breton musicians
Breton-language singers
20th-century French male singers
21st-century French male singers